William LeRoy Prince (January 26, 1913 – October 8, 1996) was an American actor who appeared in numerous soap operas and made dozens of guest appearances on primetime series as well as playing villains in movies like The Gauntlet, The Cat from Outer Space and Spontaneous Combustion.

Early life
Prince was born in Nichols, New York, the son of Myrtle Jane (née Osborne), a nurse, and Miles Gorman Prince, who worked in sales.

When Prince was a senior at Cornell University, he left to act in The Taming of the Shrew as part of a Federal Theatre tour. He gained additional experience with the Barter Theater in Abingdon, Virginia, including a trip to New York for a 1937 production. He also performed in Shakespeare's plays in a company headed by Maurice Evans.

Career
Early in Prince's career, he supplemented his limited income from acting in summer stock productions in Pennsylvania by photographing children professionally. Off-season from summer stock he was an announcer at WQXR radio in New York City.

Prince portrayed Richard in Ah, Wilderness! In 1942, he played Private Quizz West in The Eve of St. Mark. His Broadway debut came in The Eternal Road. After signing a film contract, he acted in Destination Tokyo, Objective Burma, and Dead Reckoning.

Prince worked primarily in television in the 1950s, having moved back to New York. In 1947, he became one of the founding members of The Actors Studio. Over the next decade, he made numerous appearances on anthology drama series such as Studio One, Philco Television Playhouse, and Armstrong Circle Theatre, and in 1955, Prince co-starred with Gary Merrill in the second season of Justice, an NBC drama about lawyers of the Legal Aid Society of New York.

Prince had roles on several soap operas, including one of the lead roles on Young Dr. Malone from 1958 to 1963, Another World, As the World Turns, The Edge of Night, Search for Tomorrow and A World Apart, often appearing with his actress wife Augusta Dabney. Two of his film roles were as Christian de Neuvillette in the classic 1950 Cyrano de Bergerac starring José Ferrer, and as Edward Ruddy, president of the fictional UBS network in Paddy Chayefsky's 1976 film, Network. He also gained critical acclaim  for his portrayal of patriarch Ambassador Joseph P. Kennedy in the 1977 teleplay Johnny, We Hardly knew Ye. Other films Prince appeared in include Alfred Hitchcock's Family Plot (1976), The Gauntlet (1977) with Clint Eastwood, Spies Like Us (1985) with Chevy Chase and Dan Aykroyd and The Paper (1994).

Returning to Broadway, Prince had leading roles in John Loves Mary and Forward the Heart. He appeared as Orlando in As You Like It, with Katharine Hepburn, and as Christopher Isherwood in I Am a Camera. In 1963, he played Charles Marsden in the Actors Studio production of Strange Interlude. He took leading roles in several plays by Edward Albee, beginning with The Ballad of the Sad Cafe in 1963. He understudied "Charlie" in the Broadway production of Seascape (1975), co-starred in the Hartford Stage Company's 1976 revival of All Over, appeared opposite Angela Lansbury in Counting the Ways and Listening in 1977, and played the title role in the short-lived The Man Who Had Three Arms in 1983.

During the 1970s, 1980s and into the early 1990s, Prince made guest appearances on dozens of primetime television series and miniseries including Cannon, Hawaii Five-O,  Kojak, The Rockford Files, Quincy, M.E., Matlock and Murder, She Wrote. He also reunited with Cyrano star José Ferrer for the made-for-television films The Rhinemann Exchange (1977) and Gideon's Trumpet (1980). In the latter, Ferrer played attorney for petitioner Gideon, Abe Fortas, and Prince was seen as one of the Supreme Court Justices. In 1992, he appeared on the long-running NBC drama Law & Order in the episode "The Working Stiff", playing a corrupt former governor and friend of District Attorney Adam Schiff involved in a banking scandal.

Personal life
William Prince died October 8, 1996, at Phelps Memorial Hospital in Tarrytown, New York. He was 83, and lived in Dobbs Ferry, New York, at the time of his death.

Selected filmography

The Moon Is Down (1943) – Bit Part (uncredited)
Destination Tokyo (1943) – Pills
The Very Thought of You (1944) – Fred
Hollywood Canteen (1944) – William Prince
Objective, Burma! (1945) – Lieutenant Sid Jacobs
Pillow to Post (1945) – Lieutenant Don Mallory
Cinderella Jones (1946) – Bart Williams
Shadow of a Woman (1946) – David G. MacKellar
Dead Reckoning (1947) – Sergeant Johnny Drake
Carnegie Hall (1947) – Tony Salerno Jr.
Lust for Gold (1949) – Barry Storm
Cyrano de Bergerac (1950) – Christian De Neuvillette
Secret of Treasure Mountain (1956) – Robert Kendall
The Vagabond King (1956) – Rene De Montigny
Macabre (1958) – Dr. Rodney Barrett
Sacco e Vanzetti (1971) – William Thompson
The Heartbreak Kid (1972) – Colorado Man
Blade (1973) – Powers
The Stepford Wives (1975) – Ike Mazzard
Family Plot (1976) – Bishop Wood
Network (1976) – Edward George Ruddy
Fire Sale (1977) – Mr. Cooper
Rollercoaster (1977) – Quinlan
The Gauntlet (1977) – Commissioner Edgar A. Blakelock
The Cat from Outer Space (1978) – Mr. Olympus
The Promise (1979) – George Calloway
Bronco Billy (1980) – Edgar Lipton
Love and Money (1982) – Paultz
The Soldier (1982) – The President
Kiss Me Goodbye (1982) – Reverend Hollis
The Sting II (1983) – Tuxedo (uncredited)
Movers & Shakers (1985) – Louis Martin
Fever Pitch (1985) – Mitchell
Spies Like Us (1985) – Mr. Keyes
Assassination (1987) – H.H. Royce
Nuts (1987) – Clarence Middleton
Vice Versa (1988) – Avery
Shakedown (1988) – Mr. Feinberger
Second Sight (1989) – Cardinal O'Hara
B.L. Stryker: Blind Chess (1989) - Judge Horace R. Ferrano
Spontaneous Combustion (1990) – Lew Orlander
Steel and Lace (1991) – Old Man
The Taking of Beverly Hills (1991) – Mitchell Sage
The Paper (1994) – Howard Hackett

See also
List of actors who have played the President of the United States of America

References

External links

In Loving Memory Of William Prince (Wayback Machine)
William Prince (Aveleyman)

1913 births
1996 deaths
20th-century American male actors
American male film actors
American male soap opera actors
American male television actors
Cornell University alumni
Male actors from New York (state)
People from Dobbs Ferry, New York
People from Nichols, New York